Arno Bornkamp (Amsterdam, 1959) is a Dutch classical saxophonist, the professor of the Conservatory of Amsterdam, and is considered an influential soloist in the classical repertoire.

Biography

Arno Bornkamp has won many awards, including the 'Silver Laurel of the Concertgebouw' and the 'Netherlands Music Prize' among the most noteworthy. The latter enabled him to go abroad, studying in France with Daniel Deffayet and Jean-Marie Londeix, and in Japan with Ryo Noda as well as working with composers such as Luciano Berio and Karlheinz Stockhausen.

Since 1982, he has been part of the Aurelia Saxophone Quartet where he plays tenor saxophone with Johan van der Linden on soprano saxophone, Niels Bijl on alto saxophone, and Niels Merwijk William on baritone saxophone.

Among others, he recorded the CD "Adolphe Sax Revisited" with pianist Ivo Janssen, who he has been performing with since 1983. In this cd he used period instruments, which were made by Adolphe Sax.

He has given many masterclasses across the world and has been the professor of saxophone at the Conservatory of Amsterdam since 1995.

Discography
1989: Saxophone Sonatas – Arno Bornkamp and Ivo Janssen
1993: Reed my mind
1995: The Classical Saxophone
1996: Hot Sonate - Arno Bornkamp and Ivo Janssen
1998: Scaramouche – French saxophone music
1998: Arno Bornkamp & Ivo Janssen - Saxophone and Piano
2001: Heartbreakers
2001: Adolphe sax revisited – Arno Bornkamp and Ivo Janssen
2002: Devil's Rag - The Saxophone In 12 Pieces - Arno Bornkamp and Ivo Janssen
2005: Metropolis - Berlin 1925-1933 – Arno Bornkamp, Ties Mellema, Ivo Janssen, Ultrech String Quartet
2007: Boston to Paris, the Ellisa Hall Collection
2008: Buku of horn, Arno B plays Jacob TV

External links
 Official website

References

1959 births
Dutch saxophonists
Male saxophonists
Living people
Academic staff of the Conservatorium van Amsterdam
Musicians from Amsterdam
Classical saxophonists
21st-century saxophonists
21st-century male musicians